Rogers is a masculine given name which may refer to:

 Rogers Aloro, Ugandan footballer
 Rogers Badgett (1917–2005), American businessman and philanthropist
 Rogers Beckett (born 1977), American football player
 Rogers Birnie (1851–1939), American army officer and explorer of Death Valley
 Rogers Blood (1922–1944), American Marine Corps officer
 Rogers Brubaker (born 1956), American professor of sociology
 Rogers Cadenhead (born 1967), American technology writer
 Rogers Caldwell (1890–1968), American businessman and banker
 Rogers Covey-Crump (born 1944), British tenor and early music performer
 Rogers Gaines (born 1989), American football player
 Rogers Govender (born 1960), South African Anglican priest, Dean of Manchester
 Rogers Hornsby (1896–1963), American baseball player, manager and coach, member of the National Baseball Hall of Fame
 Rogers Lehew (1928–2021), American football player, coach and executive
 Rogers Masson (born 1968), American record producer and songwriter
 Rogers McVaugh (1909–2009), American professor of botany
 Rogers Morton (1914–1979), American politician, U.S. Secretary of the Interior and Secretary of Commerce
 Rogers Mtagwa (born 1979), Tanzanian featherweight boxer
 Rogers Ofime (born 1973), Nigerian-Canadian television producer and director
 Rogers Olipa (born 2001), Ugandan cricketer
 Rogers Ruding (1751–1820), English cleric and numismatist
 Rogers Smith (born 1953), American political scientist
 Rogers Stevens (born 1970), American rock guitarist
 Rogers E. M. Whitaker (1900–1981), American editor of and contributor to The New Yorker magazine
 Rogers H. Wright (1927–2013), American psychologist 

English masculine given names